Mangaoka is a rural municipality in Madagascar. It belongs to the district of Antsiranana II, which is a part of Diana Region. It is situated at the Indian Ocean, in northern Madagascar.

Primary and junior level secondary education are available in town. The majority 95% of the population are farmers.  The most important crops are rice and maize, while other important agricultural products are banana and cassava.  Services provide employment for 0.5% of the population, while fishing employs 4.5% of the population.

Mining
The Ampasindava mine, a rare earth mine, is situated in the municipality.

References

Populated places in Diana Region